John D. Thomas (born October 19, 1956) is a former American football player and coach. He served as the head football coach at Alcorn State University from 1998 to 2007, compiling a record of 48–61.

Head coaching record

References

1956 births
Living people
Alabama State Hornets football coaches
Alcorn State Braves football coaches
Alcorn State Braves football players
Arkansas–Pine Bluff Golden Lions football coaches
Mississippi Valley State Delta Devils football coaches
People from Bay Springs, Mississippi
Coaches of American football from Mississippi
Players of American football from Mississippi
African-American coaches of American football
African-American players of American football
20th-century African-American sportspeople
21st-century African-American sportspeople